Maheshpur is a village in Lakhisarai district, Bihar, India. It has population of roughly 5785 people. It is located in Surajgarha block.

Abhaipur station is just  from Maheshpur. A road passing through the village connects the railway station with NH 33. Patna Airport and Gaya Airport are the nearest airports.

The languages spoken in this village are Hindi, Angika and English. Eighty percent of the population depend on agriculture. The major crops grown are wheat, paddy, maize and mustard, along with all other major pulses and vegetables. The most celebrated festivals are Holi, Diwali, Chhath and Durga Puja.

References 

Villages in Lakhisarai district